The EDUC-8, pronounced "educate", was an early microcomputer kit published by Electronics Australia in a series of articles starting in August 1974 and continuing to August 1975. Electronics Australia initially believed that it was the first such kit, but later discovered that Radio-Electronics had just beaten it with their Mark-8 by one month. However, Electronics Australia staff believed that their TTL design was superior to the Mark-8, as it did not require the purchase of an expensive microprocessor chip.

The EDUC-8 was an 8-bit bit-serial design with 256 bytes of RAM. The internal clock speed was 500 kHz, with an instruction speed of approximately 10 kHz, due to the bit-serial implementation. The instruction set was based on the DEC PDP-8. Although the instruction set was based on the PDP-8 it was missing quite a few instructions, along with some important flags. This was essentially an education machine designed to put people on a path to understanding how a computer worked and how to start programming what was at the time, a common computer in the market.   

Unlike the MITS Altair 8800, the EDUC-8 included two serial input and two serial output ports at the back of the computer. The EDUC-8 also had front panel lights and switches to program the computer. The later articles included a variety of peripherals, allowing the computer to interface to a keypad, octal display, paper tape loader, paper tape puncher, printer, keyboard, music player, teleprinter, magnetic tape recorder and alphanumeric display. The articles were collected into a book, where additional information was published detailing how to expand the number of I/O ports to 256, adding up to 32KB of additional memory, and using the computer to control various switches.

Like the PDP-8 this machine was equipped with the same register arrangement. Program counter, Memory Address, Memory Buffer, Accumulator and Switch Register which made programming largely the same as the original.

References

External links
 EDUC-8 kit computer at the Computer History Museum.
 The Electronics Australia EDUC-8 microcomputer
 Educ-8 Documentation
 sworld EDUC-8 Micromputer 
 The Educ-8 article collection at Archive.Org

Early microcomputers
Home computers